Armchair Theatre is the first solo album by Jeff Lynne, released in 1990.

History 
The album reunited Lynne with Electric Light Orchestra's keyboard player Richard Tandy and featured fellow Traveling Wilburys member George Harrison (both Harrison and the Wilburys were signed to Warner Bros. Records, parent of Reprise Records which released this album). Lynne wrote and recorded "Now You're Gone" as a tribute to his late mother. The album also features cover versions of two classics: "September Song" and "Stormy Weather".

The songs "Every Little Thing" and "Lift Me Up" were released as singles both featuring non-album b-sides, "I'm Gone" from the former and "Borderline" and "Sirens" from the latter. Despite positive reviews the album became only a minor hit.

A remaster by Frontiers was released on 19 April 2013 in the UK, and on 23 April 2013 in the US, and included two bonus tracks, one of them being previously unreleased. Additional bonus track was included in the Japanese re-release.

Track listing 
All songs written by Jeff Lynne, except where noted.

A ^ "Save Me Now" ends at minute 1:53. After 15 seconds of silence (1:53 – 2:08), an unusual whirring sound and seagull cawing are heard for 13 seconds. After the whirring sound there are 10 seconds of silence, followed by Jeff Lynne saying "Hey, it's still going y'know," and chimes ringing.

Personnel 
 Jeff Lynne – guitars, bass, piano, keyboards, autoharp, percussion, lead vocals, backing vocals; drums on #5 and bonus track #13
 George Harrison – acoustic guitar on #1, 3 and 5; electric slide guitar on #3, 5 and 9; backing vocals on #1 and 3
 Richard Tandy – acoustic guitar on #1 and 3; piano on #5 and 9; backing vocals on #2, 5, 9 and 10
 Mette Mathiesen – drums on #1–4 and 6–10; percussion on #1, 2, and 6; backing vocals on #5, 9 and 10
 Phil Hatton – backing vocals on #1–5, 7, 9 and 10

Additional musicians
 Jim Horn – saxophones on #1 and 2
 Hema Desai – operatic vocals on #1, classical Indian vocals on #6
 Michael Kamen – string arrangements on #1 and 9
 Jake Commander – backing vocals on #2, 5, 9 and 10
 Dave Morgan – backing vocals on #3, 5, 9 and 10
 Sireesh K. Lalwani – percussion on #3 and 6, violin on #6
 Fateh Singh Gangani, Nellai D. Kanan, Vikram A. Patil – percussion on #3 and 6
 Rita – saw on #5
 Sheila Tandy – backing vocals on #5, 9 and 10
 Ashit Desai – classical Indian vocals on #6
 Del Shannon – backing vocals on #10

Charts

References 

1990 debut albums
Jeff Lynne albums
Albums produced by Jeff Lynne
Reprise Records albums